The Desmidiaceae are one of four families of charophyte green algae in the order Desmidiales (desmids).

Genera
Genera accepted by AlgaeBase  were:
Actinodontum  – 3 species
Actinotaenium  – 57 species
Allorgeia  – 2 species
Amscottia  – 2 species
Bambusina  – 6 species
Bourellyodesmus  – 8 species
Brachytheca  – 2 species
Calocylindrus  – 3 species
Cosmaridium  – 1 species
Cosmarium  – 1063 species
Cosmocladium  – 8 species
Croasdalea  – 1 species
Cruciangulum  – 1 species
Desmidium  – 21 species
Docidium  – 37 species
Euastridium  – 3 species
Euastrum  – 324 species
Groenbladia  – 4 species
Haplotaenium  – 3 species
Heimansia  – 2 species
Hyalotheca  – 12 species
Ichthyocercus  – 6 species
Ichthyodontum  – 1 species
Mateola  – 2 species
Micrasterias  – 93 species
Onychonema  – 2 species
Oocardium  – 2 species
Pachyphorium  – 2 species
Phymatodocis  – 3 species
Pleurotaeniopsis  – 4 species
Pleurotaenium  – 85 species
Prescottiella  – 1 species
Sphaerozosma  – 19 species
Spinocosmarium  – 2 species
Spondylosium  – 31 species
Staurastrum  – 702 species
Staurodesmus  – 80 species
Streptonema  – 3 species
Teilingia  – 8 species
Tetmemorus  – 9 species
Trapezodesmus  – 1 species
Triplastrum  – 3 species
Triploceras  – 6 species
Vincularia  – 1 species
Xanthidium  – 119 species

References

External links

Scientific references

Scientific databases

 
Zygnematophyceae families